Bradd Westmoreland (born 1975) is an Australian painter.

Westmoreland holds a Bachelor of Fine Arts from the Victorian College of the Arts, having completed his degree in 1995. Since holding his first solo exhibition in 1997, Westmoreland has exhibited regularly, developing a distinctive visual style. Imagined landscapes, bright subjects and painterly backgrounds are characteristic of his work. The artist typically uses strong colours to develop form, light and shadow in his paintings.

Exhibitions 

Bradd Westmoreland has held over 15 solo exhibitions and has participated in 16 group exhibitions. He is represented by Niagara Galleries in Melbourne and has exhibited extensively at Gallery 9 in Sydney. Recently, Westmoreland’s work was included in the blockbuster exhibition, Melbourne Now.

Collections 

Westmoreland’s work is held in public and private collections across Australia and overseas. He is featured in major public galleries including the National Gallery of Victoria and the British Museum, London.

References 

1975 births
Australian painters
Victorian College of the Arts alumni
Living people